Cercopimorpha dolens is a moth of the subfamily Arctiinae. It was described by Schaus in 1905. It is found in Venezuela.

References

Moths described in 1905
Arctiinae